The 2012 CWHL Draft was held on July 14, 2012 in Mississauga. Team Alberta held the first overall pick for the first time in franchise history. The club selected Hillary Pattenden with the first pick overall.

Registration
Prospective players must register on the CWHL Draft web page to be considered for the upcoming draft.

Top 25 picks

Draft picks by team

Alberta

Boston

Brampton

Montreal

Toronto

References

Draft
Canadian Women's Hockey League